Louis Marriott (22 May 1935 – 1 August 2016) was a Jamaican actor, director, writer, broadcaster, the executive officer of the Michael Manley Foundation, and member of the Performing Right Society, Jamaica Federation of Musicians, and founding member of the Jamaica Association of Dramatic Artists.

Marriott was born on the Old Pound Road, Saint Andrew, Jamaica, the son of Egbert Marriott and Edna Irene Thompson-Marriott. He was educated at Jamaica College.  He died in Kingston at the age of 81 on 1 August 2016.

Career 
 Government public relations officer - late 1950s
 Editor, public opinion 1960–62
 Assistant public relations officer – Ninth Central American and Caribbean Games (Kingston) 1962
 Press officer – first anniversary Jamaica Independence Festival 1963
 Deputy editor of publications – Commonwealth Parliamentary Association (CPA) General Council (London) 1965-70 (lectured widely in Britain on Commonwealth and Caribbean affairs 1965–72. Was consultant-advisor for several C.P.A. conferences in the Caribbean and West Africa 1967–70)
 BBC radio writer and producer 1970–71
 Director Jamaica Independence Festival (London) 1972
 Press secretary to Prime Minister of Jamaica 1973 and 1979–80
 Assistant director – National Literacy Programme Communications 1973–74
 Director-general Information Incorporated 1974–76
 Chief organizer – Food and Drink '75 Exhibition (National Arena) July 1975
 Director publications and advertising Agency for Public Information 1976–79
 Freelance writer 1980–present - for CFNI, PAHO, WHO, Jamaica Gleaner, among several national and international bodies, and writer, director, and producer of several stage productions
 Executive officer - Michael Manley Foundation, 2000–present

Theatre 
Marriott wrote and directed for stage, and acted
 Public Mischief (1957)
 The Shepherd (1960)
 Phineas McUmbridge (1961)
 The Baiting of Reuben (1963)
 A Pack of Jokers (1978)
 More Jokers (1980)
 The New Jokers (1981)
 Playboy (1981)
 Pressure (1982)
 Office Chase (1982)
 How to Make Money (1983)
 Singer Man (1984)
 Bedward (1984, 2004) (reprisal of The Shepherd)
 Women (1984)
 Lovey (1985)
 Over the Years (1985, 2010)
 One Stop Driver (1988) (co-written with Alvin Campbell)
 Last of the Jokers (1988) (co-written with Alvin Campbell, Lavinia Marriott and Karen Marriott)
 The Adventure of Charlie Greenhorne (1991)
 Funny Biz Niz (1992)
 Life in Jamaica (1998)
 Rosie (1999)
 The Year 2000 (2000)

Marriott wrote several books including:
 Gold Rush – Jamaican Style – Jamaica in World Athletics 1948–92 (1992) (co-written with Alvin Campbell)
 Who's Who and What's What in Jamaican Arts and Entertainment (1995)

Journalism 
Marriott authored syndicated articles appearing in some 200 English-language newspapers and magazines throughout the world. He was a regular guest writer in several Jamaican newspaper publications. He wrote and produced numerous radio and television plays and documentary broadcast programmes and films in both Jamaica and Britain. He wrote The University of Brixton radio drama series for BBC English Radio 1970–71. He wrote several public education radio series for the CFNI (Caribbean Food and Nutrition Institute) during his freelance years.

Filmography 
Dr. No (1962) - Dragon Guard (uncredited)

References

1935 births
20th-century Jamaican male actors
People from Kingston, Jamaica
Jamaican dramatists and playwrights
Jamaican male writers
Male dramatists and playwrights
Jamaican journalists
Male journalists
2016 deaths
Jamaican theatre directors
Jamaican male stage actors